Kalamaki is the Greek word for a small reed, and thus for a skewer or drinking straw, and may refer to:

an alternative name for souvlaki
places in Greece:
 Kalamaki, Attica, a neighborhood of Alimos in South Athens
 Kalamaki, a village in the community of Limnochori, Achaea
 Kalamaki, Zakynthos, a resort town on the island of Zakynthos
 Kalamaki, Patras, a neighbourhood of Patras, Achaea
 Kalkan, a town in Turkey formerly called Kalamaki